Flirtation Walk is a 1934 American romantic musical film written by Delmer Daves and Lou Edelman, and directed by Frank Borzage. It focuses on a soldier (Dick Powell) who falls in love with a general's daughter (Ruby Keeler) during the general's brief stop in Hawaii but is bereft when she leaves with her father for the Philippines before their relationship can blossom. They are re-united several years later when the soldier is about to graduate from West Point and the general becomes the Academy's Commandant.

The film's title refers to a path near Trophy Point named "Flirtation Walk", where cadets often take dance dates for some time alone.

Plot 
Richard Palmer Grant Dorcy Jr. a.k.a. "the Canary" and "the singing bird of the tropics," is an enlisted man in the United States Army. Stationed in the Hawaiian Islands, he has a contentious but friendly relationship with his sergeant, Scrapper Thornhill. When General Fitts visits the post with his daughter Kit on their way to Manila, Dick is assigned to drive her to a reception that evening. Falling victim to the moonlit night, Kit and Dick attend a luau instead, and he sings Aloha ‘Oe. They are discovered in each other's arms by Scrapper and Lieutenant Biddle, who is also in love with Kit. Biddle accuses Dick of ruining Kit's reputation and forcing her to accompany him off post. Dick decides to desert. Scrapper begs Kit to straighten things out with Biddle.

To prevent Dick from deserting, Kit tells him that she was responding to a crazy impulse and he means nothing to her. Stung by her words, and Biddle's condescending statement that "if you were an officer and a gentleman, you'd understand," Dick decides to compete with Biddle as an equal and applies for West Point. He is accepted and does very well, to Scrapper's delight. In his First Class year, Dick becomes First Captain and General Fitts is appointed Academy superintendent, with Biddle present as his aide. While most of his classmates are infatuated with Kit, Dick is cold to her. Consequently, he is not very happy when the rest of the men insist that she participate in the traditional "Hundredth Night" theatrical performance that he is to direct.

Dick writes a comedy about a female general with a message directed at Kit. After the first rehearsal, Kit walks with Dick on Flirtation Walk and tries to explain why she told him she was not in love with him. Dick is too angry to listen to Kit, but during their on-stage love scene kisses her, and she admits she loves him. When, near graduation, General Fitts announces Kit's engagement to Biddle, Dick naturally is confused, and visits her after lights out to talk her out of marrying Biddle. He is caught by Biddle and, at Biddle's suggestion, agrees to resign from the Academy to protect Kit's name. Scrapper arrives at the Academy to see Dick graduate and is disappointed to learn of his resignation. The day is saved when Biddle tells Dick that his resignation was not accepted and that Kit returned his ring, wishing him good luck. Dick graduates a happy man.

Cast

Production 
The New York Times review reports that many scenes were actually shot at West Point. According to news items in The Hollywood Reporter, Bobby Connolly started shooting the Hawaiian number on July 3, 1934, on the biggest set ever constructed at Warner Bros. studios. He was scheduled to finish on July 10, at which time he would start the military wedding number using over 400 professional dancers. The success of the film led Warner Brothers to combine Powell, Keeler, Alexander, and Arledge again with Borzage and Daves under similar circumstances of plot and character to make Shipmates Forever, a film about the United States Naval Academy, the following year.

Box office 
According to Warner Bros records the film earned $1,062,000 domestically and $471,000 internationally.

Awards 
The film was nominated for the Academy Award for Best Picture and Best Sound Recording (Nathan Levinson).

Songs 
Aloha 'Oe (1878) by Princess Liliʻuokalani

Music and Lyrics by Allie Wrubel and Mort Dixon
 "Flirtation Walk"
 "I See Two Lovers"
 "Mr. and Mrs. Is the Name"
 "When Do We Eat?"
 "Smoking in the Dark"
 "No Horse, No Wife, No Mustache"

References

External links 
 
 
 
 
 
 Flirtation Walk profile, san.beck.org

1934 films
1930s musical drama films
1930s romantic musical films
American musical drama films
American romantic drama films
American romantic musical films
American black-and-white films
1930s English-language films
Films directed by Frank Borzage
First National Pictures films
Films set in the United States Military Academy
Films produced by Frank Borzage
1934 drama films
1930s American films